Maia Bitadze (born 14 May 1977) is a Georgian politician. Since 2020, she has been a member of the Parliament of Georgia of the 10th convocation by party list on the Georgian Dream ticket.

References

People from Georgia (country)
1977 births
Living people